Lars von Stockenström (13 December 1894 – 25 July 1968) was a Swedish equestrian. He competed in the individual jumping event at the 1920 Summer Olympics.

References

1894 births
1968 deaths
Swedish male equestrians
Olympic equestrians of Sweden
Equestrians at the 1920 Summer Olympics
Sportspeople from Stockholm